Brockway Airport  is a small government airfield located  northeast of Brockway, New Brunswick, Canada.

References

External links
Page about this aerodrome on COPA's Places to Fly airport directory

Registered aerodromes in New Brunswick
Transport in York County, New Brunswick
Buildings and structures in York County, New Brunswick